Melinia is a genus of plants in the family Apocynaceae, first described as a genus in 1835. It was initially given the name Brachylepis, but this turned out to be an illegitimate homonym, meaning that someone else had already used the name for a different plant. Melinia is native to South America.

Species
 Melinia eichleri (E. Fourn.) K. Schum. - Brazil
 Melinia peruviana Schltr. - Ayacucho in Peru
 Melinia volcanense Krapov. & S. Cáceres - Jujuy Province in NW Argentina

formerly included
moved to other genera (Hemipogon, Metastelma, Oxypetalum, Philibertia, Widgrenia)

References

Asclepiadoideae
Apocynaceae genera